Elkhan Zeynalli, also known by his stage name Qaraqan (Azerbaijani language for 'blackblood'), is a famous Azerbaijani songwriter, musician, writer, first prize winner of National Book Award 2010. A graduate of the Turkish Lyceum in Baku (TDV-BTL), he studied journalism at Baku State University.

Career
In 2007 being a first year student he became a founder and leader of H.O.S.T. – the most famous hip-hop group in Azerbaijan for the past ten years. The first demo album of the group was released on internet and received thousands views right away. Starting as just a music community H.O.S.T. grew into a big movement of creative youth. H.O.S.T. has released two albums: "Proloq " 2007 (eng. Prologue) and "Qarada qırmızı" 2008 (eng. Red in black), and performed on big stages of Azerbaijan Republic. There was a generation of young people calling themselves "HOSTed", which means those who follow the ideas described in the songs of H.O.S.T. group – propaganda of intelligence, justice, free thinking and personality.

In 2010 Qaraqan has started his own project. Royal Pashayev from H.O.S.T. started work with him as producer and art director. Elkhan is performing in unique music genre – spoken word, acoustic hip-hop and jazz poetry where lyrics and music create a magical tandem. Qaraqan authored more than 200 songs, written for his group and himself. He has released three solo albums: "Qısa Qapanma" 2009 (eng. Short circuit), "Ishiq" 2011 (eng. Light) and "Leykemia" 2013 (eng. Leukemia). These albums brought Qaraqan on a new level, making him a cult figure in the music art of Azerbaijan. Qaraqan performed successfully in Norwegian Embassy of Azerbaijan Republic, Ankara and Istanbul (Turkey) within two weeks tour, in Moscow City (Russia) etc. In 2015 Qaraqan performed in Austin, Texas as an official representative of SXSW Festival.
At the same time Qaraqan is a famous book writer. He has published 7 novels which all became bestsellers in his homeland. He has got presidential scholarship for achievements in literature, was announced author of the year 2010 and won the first prize at the National Book Award for his novel "A" which he has written when he was 20 years old. His novel "A" (eng. A) and "Mələk" (eng. Angel) were translated into Russian and English languages. Qaraqan is a member of Union of Azerbaijani Writers, the largest public organization of Azerbaijani writers, poets and publicists. In 2014 he became one of the members of the council of the Union.

Discography
 H.O.S.T. "Proloq" 2007 (eng. Prologue)
 H.O.S.T. "Qarada Qırmızı" 2008 (eng. Red in Black)
 Qaraqan "Qısa Qapanma" 2009 (eng. Short Circuit)
 Qaraqan "İşıq" 2011 (eng. Light)
 Qaraqan "Leykemiya" 2013 (eng. Leukemia)

Books
 "A" 2007 (eng. A)
 "Bir Milyon Dollarım Olsaydı" 2009 (eng. If I had a million dollars)
 "Исповедь Одного Извращенца" 2011 (eng. Confession of one pervert)
 "Mələk" 2012 (eng. Angel)
 "Evakuasiya" 2013 (eng. Evacuation)
 "Birinci addım. Beş anonim milyonçu" 2013 (eng. Step one. Five anonymous millionaires)
 "İkinci addım. Həqiqətin beş adı" 2014 (eng. Step two. Five names of truth)
 "Üçüncü addım" 2016 (eng. Step three Numerical forest )
 "Art və Xaos" 2019 (eng. Art and Chaos)

References

Azerbaijani hip hop musicians
Azerbaijani writers
1987 births
Living people